XHEMOS-FM is a radio station on 94.1 FM in Los Mochis, Sinaloa, Mexico. The station is operated by GPM Sinaloa and is known as Los 40 pop format.

History

XEMOS-AM received its concession on October 28, 1994, operating on 1130 kHz as a 500-watt daytimer. XEMOS later boosted its power to 1 kW day with 250 watts at night.

XHEMOS-FM was authorized in 2011.

In 2014, Radiorama began joint operations with Promomedios of the former's Los Mochis cluster. That resulted in new formats for XHEMOS and sister XHMIL-FM 90.1. In 2016, the format for XHEMOS was tweaked from straight pop to "Pop Love" with the addition of Spanish oldies to the station's playlist.

The format was changed to the Radiópolis "Vox Love Station" format, largely in the same genre, in April 2020. It was the second station to adopt the brand and the first in nearly two years.

On August 31, 2021, Vox was replaced by Los 40, which had been dropped by XHREV-FM 104.3 months prior when it was leased out.

References

Radio stations in Sinaloa
Mexican radio stations with expired concessions